Gonocarpus chinensis is an Australian shrub in the watermilfoil family Haloragaceae native to eastern Australia.

References

Flora of Queensland
Flora of New South Wales
chinensis
Plants described in 1790